Keep The Dream Alive or Keeping the Dream Alive may refer to:

Songs
"Keep The Dream Alive", a song by Praga Khan from the 2000 album Mutant Funk
"Keep The Dream Alive", a single Tony Mills (musician)
"Keep The Dream Alive", a single by Light of the World (band)
"Keep The Dream Alive", a song by John Vanderslice, from the 2001 album Time Travel Is Lonely
"Keep the Dream Alive", a song performed by Kelly King at the 2013 Viña del Mar International Song Festival
"Keep The Dream Alive", a song by Oasis from the 2005 album Don't Believe the Truth
"Keeping the Dream Alive", a song by Münchener Freiheit from the 1988 album Fantasy

Other uses
Keep The Dream Alive (album), a 1977 album by jazz saxophonist David "Fathead" Newman
"Keep The Dream Alive", Martin Luther King Humanitarian award won by Wolfgang Busch and many others